Fabio della Corgna (1600–1643) was an Italian painter of the early Baroque. He was born in Perugia to the family of the Dukes of Castiglione del Lago (Lanzi states they were Dukes of Corgna, descendants of the condottiere Ascanio della Corgna), near Perugia. He attended the artists' academy of Stefano Amadei.

Sources

Sources

17th-century Italian painters
Italian male painters
Italian Baroque painters
1600 births
1643 deaths
Umbrian painters